The 2014 German motorcycle Grand Prix was the ninth round of the 2014 MotoGP season. It was held at the Sachsenring in Hohenstein-Ernstthal on 13 July 2014.

A light rain shortly before the MotoGP race led a large number of riders to choose to go to the grid with wet weather tyres. However, the rain started to dry quickly causing a number of riders to switch to slicks at the end of the formation lap which meant those riders had to start from pit lane. 
This resulted in only 9 of the 23 riders starting on the grid. Only three riders on the grid were on slicks (Stefan Bradl, Hiroshi Aoyama, Karel Abraham). Stefan Bradl, who swapped to slicks between the sighting and warm up laps, was the only rider on any of the first five rows.

Classification

MotoGP

Moto2

Moto3

Championship standings after the race (MotoGP)
Below are the standings for the top five riders and constructors after round nine has concluded.

Riders' Championship standings

Constructors' Championship standings

 Note: Only the top five positions are included for both sets of standings.

References

German
Motorcycle Grand Prix
German motorcycle Grand Prix
German motorcycle Grand Prix